Team Abu Dhabi is a team competing in the World Rally Championship. Team Abu Dhabi was set up in 2007 with the support of the Abu Dhabi Tourism Authority (ADTA) with the purpose of giving drivers from Abu Dhabi the opportunity to compete internationally. During 2007 ADTA began sponsoring the Ford World Rally Team, in a deal that saw Emirati driver Khalid Al Qassimi competing for the team. In 2011 Team Abu Dhabi has entered as a separate 'WRC Team'.

History
In late 2006 Ron Cremen, a former rally driver from Australia and team manager for Al Qassimi approached the Abu Dhabi Government with the concept of starting a junior rally team. Team Abu Dhabi was created under the guidance of Shaikh Sultan bin Tahnoon Al Nahyan, the Chairman of ADTA with the purpose of creating an opportunity for Abu Dhabi drivers to experience rallying at all levels. Al Qassimi contested the Middle East Rally Championship under the banner in 2007, while he joined the Ford World Rally Team from Rally Finland as a result of ADTA's sponsorship deal with the team.

In 2009 three drivers, Bader Al Jabri, Ahmed Al Mansoori and Majed Al Shamsi competed in the Fiesta Sporting Trophy International, run on WRC events. The trio finished third, fifth and sixth in the standings respectively. Al Jabri and Al Shamsi continued in the series in 2010, finishing second and fourth respectively. In 2011 they are competing in the Production World Rally Championship.

For 2011 Team Abu Dhabi has registered as a WRC Team, allowing Al Qassimi to score points for the manufacturers' championship.

References

External links
WRC.com team profile 

World Rally Championship teams
Motorsport in the United Arab Emirates
Sport in Abu Dhabi